Sinthanai Selvan is an Indian politician who is a Member of Legislative Assembly of Tamil Nadu. He was elected from Kattumannarkoil as an Viduthalai Chiruthaigal Katchi candidate in 2021.

Electoral performance

References 

Tamil Nadu MLAs 2021–2026
Living people
Viduthalai Chiruthaigal Katchi politicians
Tamil Nadu politicians
Year of birth missing (living people)